Krupa na Vrbasu City Stadium is a multi-use stadium in Krupa na Vrbasu, Bosnia and Herzegovina. It is the home ground of First League of the Republika Srpska club FK Krupa. The stadium capacity is 3,500 seats.

Football venues in Bosnia and Herzegovina
Multi-purpose stadiums in Bosnia and Herzegovina